Joseph Warren Fordney (November 5, 1853 – January 8, 1932) was an American Republican politician from Saginaw, Michigan. He represented Saginaw County and the surrounding area of Central Michigan in the U.S. House of Representatives for twenty-four years.

Biography
Fordney was born on a farm near Hartford City, Indiana, where he attended the common schools. He moved to Saginaw, Michigan, in June 1869 and engaged in the lumber industry. Afterward became the owner of extensive lumber enterprises and the vice president of the Saginaw Board of Trade. He was also a member of the Saginaw Board of Aldermen from 1896 to 1900.

In November 1898, Fordney defeated incumbent Democrat Ferdinand Brucker to be elected as a Republican from Michigan's 8th congressional district to the 56th United States Congress. He was subsequently re-elected to the eleven succeeding Congresses, serving from March 4, 1899 to March 3, 1923.  Fordney served as the chairman of the Committee on Expenditures in the Department of the Navy in the 59th Congress; and of the Committee on Ways and Means in the 66th and 67th Congresses.  He co-sponsored the 1922 Fordney–McCumber Tariff. He declined to be a candidate for renomination in 1922.  He was also a delegate to the Republican National Conventions in 1908, 1924, and 1928.

After leaving Congress, Fordney returned to the lumber business in Saginaw and was also interested in banking and agricultural pursuits. He died in Saginaw and is interred there in St. Andrew’s Cemetery.

Bibliography
Russell, John A. Joseph Warren Fordney: An American Legislator. Boston: The Stratford Co., 1928.

References

The Political Graveyard

1853 births
1932 deaths
Republican Party members of the United States House of Representatives from Michigan
Burials in Michigan
Businesspeople in timber
Politicians from Saginaw, Michigan
19th-century American businesspeople
20th-century American businesspeople
19th-century American politicians
20th-century American politicians